Leiolepis guentherpetersi, Peters's butterfly lizard, is a species of agamid lizard. It is found in Vietnam.

References

Leiolepis
Reptiles of Vietnam
Reptiles described in 1993
Taxa named by Ilya Darevsky